Gilbert à Beckett may refer to:
 Gilbert Abbott à Beckett (1811–1856), English humorist
 Gilbert Arthur à Beckett (1837–1891), his son, English writer